Otto was Count of Louvain from 1038 through 1040. He was allegedly a legendary count.

Counts of Louvain
11th-century people of the Holy Roman Empire